Staiger is the surname of

 Carlos Staiger (1907–1997), German-American industrial enterpriser
 Libi Staiger (born 1928), American actress
 Lucca Staiger (born 1988), German college basketball player
 Janet Staiger, contemporary American Professor of Communication
 Ludwig Staiger, German mathematician and computer scientist
 Karl Theodor Staiger (died 1888), German  chemical analyst
 Markus Staiger,  German founder of the Nuclear Blast record company
 Otto Staiger (1894–1967), Swiss painter
 Roy Staiger (born 1950), American baseball player
 Maverick Staiger American trombonist